Olympic Games is a 1927 American short silent comedy film directed by Anthony Mack.

Plot
The Gang competes in their version of the Olympics. As the boys try their hand at shot put, pole vault, and hurdles, Wheezer arrives and begins to teach Minnie how to do a Razzberry. They secretly razzle the Gang, and the gang keeps beating up an outsider who they accuse of the razzles. Farina tries the shot put, then later exhibits an exceptional pole vault.  Joe has troubles with the pull up bar and a javelin. Peggy and Jean arrive to cheer on their hero, Joe.  A rival gang appears and begins to pelt the kids with eggs and tomatoes. The Gang returns fire and hilarity results. They eventually catch Wheezer and Minnie razzing them; and they confront Wheezer. Wheezer sics Minnie on the Gang as they run away, Minnie on their heels.

Cast

The Gang
Joe Cobb as Joe
Jackie Condon as Jackie
Allen Hoskins as Farina
Bobby Hutchins as Wheezer
Jay R. Smith as Spec
Harry Spear as Harry
Paul Toien as Our Gang member
Pete the Pup as Minnie

Additional cast
Johnny Aber as Rival kid
Peggy Ahern as Peggie
Jack Hanlon as Rival kid
Jannie Hoskins as Mango
Mildred Kornman as Mildred
Jean Darling as Jean
Scooter Lowry as Undetermined role
Joseph Metzger as Undetermined role
Robert Parrish as Undetermined role

See also
Our Gang filmography

References

External links

1927 films
1927 comedy films
1927 short films
American silent short films
American black-and-white films
Films directed by Robert A. McGowan
Hal Roach Studios short films
Films about fictional Olympics-inspired events
Our Gang films
1920s American films
Silent American comedy films
1920s English-language films